Gim Hyowon (Hangul: 김효원, Hanja: 金孝元; 1542 – 1 April 1590) was a Korean philosopher and politician during the Joseon Dynasty. A Neo-Confucian scholar, his pen name was Seongam (성암, 省庵), and his courtesy name was Inbaek (인백, 仁伯). He was also a leader of the Easterners faction. Gim was from the Seonsan Gim clan (선산 김씨, 善山 金氏).

Family 
 Grandfather
 Gim Deok-yu (김덕유, 金德裕)
 Father
 Gim Hong-woo (김홍우, 金弘遇)
 Mother
 Lady Yun of the Haepyeong Yun clan (해평 윤씨, 海平 尹氏)
 Siblings 
 Younger brother - Gim Yi-won (김이원, 金履元) (1553 - 1614)
 Sister-in-law - Lady Gim of the Gangneung Gim clan (강릉 김씨)
 Nephew - Gim Geuk-jeon (김극전, 金克銓)
 Nephew - Gim Geuk-myeong (김극명, 金克銘)
 Nephew - Gim Geuk-bin (김극빈, 金克鑌) (1600 - 1628)
 Cousin-in-law - Princess Jeonggeun (정근옹주,貞謹翁主) (1601 – 11 July 1613)
 Adoptive first cousin - Gim Se-pil (김세필, 金世泌); son of Gim Geuk-geon 
 Niece - Lady Gim of the Seonsan Gim clan (선산 김씨, 善山 金氏)
 Niece - Lady Gim of the Seonsan Gim clan (선산 김씨, 善山 金氏)
 Niece - Lady Gim of the Seonsan Gim clan (선산 김씨, 善山 金氏)
 Niece - Lady Gim of the Seonsan Gim clan (선산 김씨, 善山 金氏)
 Younger brother - Gim Shin-won (김신원, 金信元)
 Younger brother - Gim Ui-won (김의원, 金義元)
 Wives and their children 
 Lady Jeong of the Chogye Jeong clan (초계 정씨)
 Son - Gim Geuk-geon (김극건, 金克健)
 Daughter-in-law - Lady Heo of the Yangcheon Heo clan (양천 허씨, 陽川 許氏)
 Grandson - Gim Se-ryeom (김세렴, 金世濂)
 Grandson - Gim Se-pil (김세필, 金世弼); became the adoptive son of Gim Geuk-bin
 Daughter - Lady Gim of the Seonsan Gim clan (선산 김씨, 善山 金氏)
 Son-in-law - Heo Gyun (허균, 許筠) (10 December 1569 – 12 October 1618)
 Granddaughter - Royal Consort Sohun of the Yangcheon Heo clan (소훈 허씨)
 Grandson - Heo Gwing (허굉, 許宏)
 Great-Grandson - Heo Heum (허흠, 許嶔)
 Son - Gim Geuk-seon (김극선, 金克銑)
 Son - Gim Geuk-ryeon (김극련, 金克鍊)
 Son - Gim Geuk-gam (김극감, 金克鑑)

Works 
 Seongam jip (성암집, 省庵集)

See also
 Sim Ui-gyeom
 Yi Hwang
 Jo Sik

References

1532 births
1590 deaths
16th-century Korean philosophers
Joseon scholar-officials
Korean Confucianists
Korean scholars
Neo-Confucian scholars